Tsukuryne is an urban-type settlement in the Pokrovsk Raion, Donetsk Oblast (province) of eastern Ukraine. The population is

Demographics
Native language as of the Ukrainian Census of 2001:
 Ukrainian 33.58%
 Russian 65.63%
 Belarusian 0.21%
 Moldovan (Romanian) and German 0.04%

References

Urban-type settlements in Pokrovsk Raion